Cartledge may refer to:

Places
 Cartledge, a hamlet in Derbyshire, England
 Cartledge Hall and Cartledge Grange, in Holmesfield, Derbyshire, England; see Notable Buildings in Holmesfield
 Mount Cartledge, a mountain in the Athos Range, Prince Charles Mountains, Antarctica
 Cartledge House, an historic house in Batesburg-Leesville, Lexington County, South Carolina

People
 Brian Cartledge, Australian cricketer
 Bryan Cartledge, British diplomat
 David Cartledge, English cricketer
 Frank Cartledge, English footballer
 Geoff Cartledge, Australian rules footballer
 Graham S Cartledge, High Sheriff of Nottinghamshire 2014-2015
 Gwendolyn Cartledge, American educationist and academic
 Horace Avron Cartledge, British Senior Overseas Inspector, Education Division;  see 1967 Birthday Honours
 Jack Pickering Cartledge, Australian public servant; see 1947 Birthday Honours
 John Cartledge, English cricketer
 John Cartledge (footballer), English footballer
 Paul Cartledge, British ancient historian and academic
 Paul Cartledge (music producer), English record producer
 Sam Cartledge, English footballer
 Tristan Cartledge, Australian rules footballer
 Vincent Cartledge Reddish, British astronomer

See also
 Meryl Cartlege and Anita Cartlege, characters in the TV series Springhill
 Cartlidge, including Cartlich